Bayan Beleq Mosque is the oldest mosque on the island of Lombok, Indonesia, reportedly dating back to 1634. It is located in Bayan village.

See also 
 Islam in Indonesia
 List of mosques in Indonesia

References

Mosques in Indonesia
Religious buildings and structures completed in 1634